Mykola Simkaylo (21 November 1952, Kazakhstan – 21 May 2013) was eparch of the Ukrainian Catholic Eparchy of Kolomyia – Chernivtsi in Ukraine since 2 June 2005 until his death.

Views on ecumenism
Bishop Simkaylo was known to be a strong supporter of Christian ecumenism. Speaking to the charity Aid to the Church in Need during a visit, he praised President Yushchenko "personally acting as a catalyst to reconcile the various factions of the Orthodox Church in Ukraine", as well as Major Archbishop Cardinal Lubomyr Husar.

Citations

External links
Official biography from the eparchy website
Mykola Simkaylo

Bishops of the Ukrainian Greek Catholic Church
1952 births
2013 deaths
People from Karaganda
Kazakhstani people of Ukrainian descent
21st-century Eastern Catholic bishops